Calopappus is a monotypic genus of flowering plants in the family Asteraceae, containing the single species Calopappus acerosus. It is endemic to central Chile, where it occurs in the Andes.

References

Monotypic Asteraceae genera
Endemic flora of Chile
Nassauvieae